In mathematics, the Fatou conjecture, named after Pierre Fatou, states that a quadratic family of maps from the complex plane to itself is hyperbolic for an open dense set of parameters.

References

Dynamical systems
Conjectures